Ramiz Hasan Raja (born 14 August 1962) is a Pakistani cricket administrator, commentator,  YouTuber, and former cricketer who served as the 35th Chairman of the Pakistan Cricket Board between September 2021 and December 2022.

As a player, Raja represented Pakistan (sporadically as a captain) during the 1980s and the 1990s.

He also talks about cricket on his YouTube channel Ramiz Speaks.

Early life and education
Raja was born in Punjabi Muslim Rajput family of Janjua clan.  His parents had migrated from the Indian city of Jaipur, Rajasthan during Partition of India, while on his wife's side, his mother-in-law is from Delhi and his father-in-law is from Karnal, Haryana.

An admirer of Rajasthani architecture, he eventually asked Pakistani architect Nayyar Ali Dada to design his Lahore house on the pattern of Jaipur's Rambagh Palace.

His father Saleem Akhtar was a cricketer during the British colonial era who played for Multan and Sargodha after the partition, while his brother Wasim Raja and his cousin Atif Rauf played for the Pakistan national cricket team, with another brother Zaeem Raja having played first-class cricket as well.

Raja is an alumnus of Sadiq Public School, Bahawalpur, Aitchison College, Lahore and Government College University, Lahore.

Domestic career
Ramiz made his first-class cricket debut in 1978, scoring over 9,000 runs in List A and 10,000 runs in first class matches. He remains one of only a few to reach 10,000 first class runs in Pakistan. He got a national call against England. He was regarded as one of the prominent batters playing in Pakistan's domestic cricket.

International career

Golden years
He received his opportunity to play in a Test match against England. His performance was unimpressive, as he was dismissed for 1 run in each innings. However, with the retirement of several players in the Pakistan squad and with the help of his years of experience in first-class cricket, Raja was able to secure a spot in the national side.

Ramiz played international cricket for 13 years, appearing in 57 Test matches, with a career average of 31.83 and scoring two centuries. In the One Day International arena, he played 198 matches and scored 9 centuries. He was a member of the national side that reached the semi finals of the 1987 World Cup. He scored 2 centuries in the 1992 World Cup, which was held in Australia, including a century against New Zealand, who had been undefeated during that period. He was awarded the man of the match for his match winning performance which earned Pakistan a place in the semi-finals of the tournament. In the final against England, Ramiz had the honour of taking the final catch which won the World Cup for Pakistan. This became the pinnacle of his cricketing career, as within a year of this triumph, he had lost form and was dropped from the national side.

Obstructing the field 
Ramiz became the first player in One Day International history to be given out "obstructing the field" against England, in a match at Karachi in 1987. England had scored 263 runs for 6 wickets during their 44 over innings. For Pakistan, Raja opened the batting and had reached 98 runs when the last ball of the match was bowled, with Pakistan needing 25 runs to win in the last over. During this last over, he hit the ball and sprinted for two runs that would have given him his century, but was well short of the crease when the fielder's return came towards him and Raja knocked the ball away with his bat and was given out for "obstructing the field".

Late career
He was recalled back to the Pakistan squad and played in the 1996 Cricket World Cup. During the 1995–1996 season, he was removed from the captaincy, after Pakistan lost their first home series to Sri Lanka. His final game in a Test match for Pakistan was as captain in the 1996–1997 tour of Sri Lanka, however the team failed to win a match during the series. He retired from all forms of cricket in 1997 and since then he has been active as a television commentator and as an administrator for both Pakistan and international cricket.

Commentary career
Raja has worked as a commentator on Test Match Special and Sky Sports, during the 2006 England Test series against Pakistan. He has also worked as the chief executive of the Pakistan Cricket Board, but resigned from his job in August 2004, citing increasing media commitments. He continues to provide commentary on Pakistan cricket team's tours as well as in many domestic tournaments and international ICC tournaments.

See also
 List of cricket commentators

References

External links

Ramiz Raja on Twitter

1962 births
Living people
Allied Bank Limited cricketers
Islamabad cricketers
Cricketers from Faisalabad
Aitchison College alumni
Pakistan Cricket Board Presidents and Chairmen
Pakistan National Shipping Corporation cricketers
Pakistan One Day International cricketers
Pakistan Test cricketers
Pakistan Test cricket captains
Pakistani cricket captains
Muhajir people
Pakistani people of Rajasthani descent
Cricketers at the 1987 Cricket World Cup
Cricketers at the 1992 Cricket World Cup
Cricketers at the 1996 Cricket World Cup
Pakistani cricket commentators
Sadiq Public School alumni
Service Industries cricketers
Lahore City cricketers
Lahore City A cricketers
Lahore City Whites cricketers
Punjab (Pakistan) cricketers
St. Anthony's High School, Lahore alumni
Government College University, Lahore alumni
Pakistani YouTubers
Central Model School, Lahore alumni
Pakistani cricket administrators